"The Golden Man" is an 11,600-word science fiction short story by American writer Philip K. Dick. It was received by the Scott Meredith Literary Agency on June 24, 1953, and first published in the April 1954 issue of If magazine. The story was illustrated by Kelly Freas in its original publication. The story is set in a post-apocalyptic future where the existence of potentially powerful mutants has become a reality. The mutants are seen as dangerous and have been hunted to death by human beings for years. A golden-skinned mutant called Cris is captured by the government, which attempts to execute him. However, his appearance and abilities to see into the future allow him to escape.

Plot summary
The protagonists of the story are a government agent and his fiancée who are members of a government agency tasked with tracking down and sterilizing or eliminating mutants – individuals with physical abnormalities and superhuman powers (such as mind reading or telekinesis) that make them a threat to normal humans. The eponymous "Golden Man" is a beautiful yet feral young man named Cris with gold-colored skin and the proportions of a Greek god. He possesses no language but has the ability to see into the future (specifically, the ability to see all possible outcomes from any single action, described in the story as similar to a chess player with the ability to see all possible moves 5 steps ahead). The agency manages to capture Cris after surrounding him so completely that his precognition tells him there's no way out, at which point he simply surrenders himself. The agency takes him back to their fortified laboratory to study his abilities, and then execute him. Unknown to the agency, Cris's physical perfection and noble-looking countenance influences the fiancée into freeing him. He then impregnates her and makes his escape as she provides a distraction to aid him. The story ends with the protagonist reflecting on how animal instincts have triumphed over human intellect, and how that is the new direction evolution will take if Cris continues to breed children with his abilities.

Reception
In the Story Notes for the collection The Golden Man, Dick wrote of the eponymous short story:

Film adaptation
The film Next, a very loose adaptation of "The Golden Man", was released in 2007. It was directed by Lee Tamahori and stars Nicolas Cage as Cris Johnson and co-stars Julianne Moore, Jessica Biel, Thomas Kretschmann, and Peter Falk.

See also

References

External links

1954 short stories
Short stories by Philip K. Dick
Short stories adapted into films
Works originally published in If (magazine)
Novelettes